The Jade Trilogy is a set of three fantasy novels written by Japanese award-winning fantasy writer Noriko Ogiwara. The trilogy consists of the original novel and its two sequels.

Overview
The first novel of the trilogy, originally written in Japanese as: Sorairo Magatama (空色勾玉 "Sky-colored Jade"; see magatama), won her several awards for children's literature.  Translated by Cathy Hirano, the novel was first published in English by Farrar, Straus and Giroux as Dragon Sword and Wind Child.  Several years after falling out of print, a second edition of the novel was published by VIZ Media LLC with an updated translation by Hirano.

After the success of Dragon Sword and Wind Child, Ogiwara later wrote a sequel to the story of the original novel, titled Hakuchou Iden (白鳥異伝 "Swan's Strange Legend"). The sequel was also praised by the Japanese media and fans of the original novel.  The second novel of the trilogy was translated by Hirano and the English edition was released by Viz Media LLC as Mirror Sword and Shadow Prince on May 17, 2011.

The author would later continue the story with another sequel called Usubeni Tennyo (薄紅天女 "Pink Nymph"); this book was also a favorite among fans of the original novel and like the first two novels is still in print to this day in Japan. The last sequel of the trilogy is currently unavailable in English.

References

<div class="references-big">

<div class="references-big">

External links
Dragon Sword and Wind Child; novel (English Webpage, Amazon) 
Dragon Sword and Wind Child; novel (Japanese Webpage, Amazon)
Dragon Sword and Wind Child; novel (Original Japanese version, Amazon) 空色勾玉 (単行本)
Dragon Sword and Wind Child; novel (New Japanese Version, Amazon) 空色勾玉
Dragon Sword and Wind Child; novel (Japanese Version) Exact Information Unknown, Amazon

Fantasy novel trilogies
Series of children's books
Japanese children's novels